Chiquitoy is a town in Northern Peru in Santiago de Cao district of Ascope Province in the region La Libertad. This town is located some 38 km northwest of Trujillo city in the agricultural Chicama Valley.

See also
Ascope Province
Chavimochic
Virú Valley
Virú
Moche valley

External links
Location of Chiquitoy by Wikimapia

References

  

Populated places in La Libertad Region